Be Makara is a Cambodian football manager, currently in charge of premier division club Boeung Ket.

References 

Cambodian football managers
1977 births
Living people